Jamul (Kumeyaay: Ha-mul, meaning "sweet water") is a census-designated place (CDP) in San Diego County, California, United States. Jamul had a population of 6,163 at the 2010 census.

Jamul suffered from the Valley Fire, one of the 2020 California wildfires.

Geography

Demographics

2010
At the 2010 census Jamul had a population of 6,163. The racial makeup of Jamul was 5,300 (86.0%) White, 127 (2.1%) African American, 28 (0.5%) Native American, 146 (2.4%) Asian, 10 (0.2%) Pacific Islander, 294 (4.8%) from other races, and 258 (4.2%) from two or more races. Hispanic or Latino of any race were 1,188 persons (19.3%).

The census reported that 6,105 people (99.1% of the population) lived in households, 18 (0.3%) lived in non-institutionalized group quarters, and 40 (0.6%) were institutionalized.

There were 1,906 households, 727 (38.1%) had children under the age of 18 living in them, 1,409 (73.9%) were opposite-sex married couples living together, 136 (7.1%) had a female householder with no husband present, 101 (5.3%) had a male householder with no wife present.  There were 68 (3.6%) unmarried opposite-sex partnerships, and 28 (1.5%) same-sex married couples or partnerships. 187 households (9.8%) were one person and 84 (4.4%) had someone living alone who was 65 or older. The average household size was 3.20.  There were 1,646 families (86.4% of households); the average family size was 3.38.

The age distribution was 1,396 people (22.7%) under the age of 18, 585 people (9.5%) aged 18 to 24, 1,161 people (18.8%) aged 25 to 44, 2,198 people (35.7%) aged 45 to 64, and 823 people (13.4%) who were 65 or older.  The median age was 44.4 years. For every 100 females, there were 101.0 males.  For every 100 females age 18 and over, there were 99.1 males.

There were 1,974 housing units at an average density of 117.3 per square mile, of the occupied units 1,692 (88.8%) were owner-occupied and 214 (11.2%) were rented. The homeowner vacancy rate was 0.9%; the rental vacancy rate was 2.7%.  5,404 people (87.7% of the population) lived in owner-occupied housing units and 701 people (11.4%) lived in rental housing units.

2000
At the 2000 census there were 5,920 people, 1,762 households, and 1,541 families in the CDP. The population density was 359.9 inhabitants per square mile (138.9/km). The racial makeup of the CDP was 86.37% White, 2.13% African American, 0.39% Native American, 3.07% Asian, 0.24% Pacific Islander, 3.63% from other races, and 4.17% from two or more races. Hispanic or Latino of any race were 13.77%.

Of the 1,762 households 44.3% had children under the age of 18 living with them, 77.7% were married couples living together, 6.0% had a female householder with no husband present, and 12.5% were non-families. 8.5% of households were one person and 3.5% were one person aged 65 or older.  The average household size was 3.30 and the average family size was 3.48.

The age distribution was 29.7% under the age of 18, 7.2% from 18 to 24, 25.7% from 25 to 44, 28.4% from 45 to 64, and 9.0% 65 or older.  The median age was 39 years. For every 100 females, there were 101.2 males.  For every 100 females age 18 and over, there were 98.7 males.

The median household income was $87,309 and the median family income  was $89,550. Males had a median income of $60,808 versus $40,568 for females. The per capita income for the CDP was $32,450.  About 5.0% of families and 8.9% of the population were below the poverty line, including 10.6% of those under age 18 and 7.5% of those age 65 or over.

Casino Controversy

There was some opposition. The chief concern was the increased traffic on the main road through the town, Highway 94. The location was such that all the traffic to and from the proposed casino would likely pass through the middle of the town.

In spite of the opposition, the tribe went ahead with the casino. Penn National Gaming became the developer, lender and manager of a $400 million Hollywood Casino in collaboration with the Jamul Indian Village. Hollywood Casino Jamul-San Diego opened on October 10, 2016. The casino included a three-story gaming and entertainment facility of approximately 200,000 square feet, featuring over 1,700 slot machines, 40 live table games, multiple restaurants, bars and lounges and an enclosed below-grade parking structure with approximately 1,800 spaces.

Politics
In the California State Senate, Jamul is located in California's 40th State Senate district, represented by Democrat Ben Hueso of San Diego.

References

External links
 Jamul Census page
 Jamul Indian Village
 Jamul Casino San Diego

Census-designated places in San Diego County, California
East County (San Diego County)
Census-designated places in California